B7, B.VII, B07 or B-7 may refer to:

Vehicles and transportation
 Alpina B7, a luxury sedan
 B07, a type of train in London; see Docklands Light Railway rolling stock
 B7 (New York City bus), serving Brooklyn
 Bundesstraße 7, a German Bundesstraße (Federal Highway)
 Bavarian B VII, an 1868 German experimental locomotive
 NSB B7 (Class 7), Norwegian railway carriages
 HMS B7, a B-class submarine of the Royal Navy
 Blackburn B-7, a British aircraft
 Lohner B.VII, an aircraft
 Douglas Y1B-7, a bomber of the United States Army Air Corps
 UNI Airways (Taiwan) IATA airline designator
 Boeing 777
 Bensen B-7, a 1955 United States small rotor kite
 LNER Class B7, a class of British steam locomotives

Science
 B7 (protein), a protein in the immune system
 HLA-B7, an HLA-B serotype
 Vitamin B7, another name for biotin
 A subclass of B-class stars
 Boron-7 (B-7 or 7B), an isotope of boron

Other
 B7, a diesel fuel containing 7% biodiesel
 B7, the second highest note on a piano, nearly two octaves above Soprano C
 B7, an international standard paper size (88×125 mm), defined in ISO 216
 B7 Baltic Islands Network, a cooperation between governments of seven islands in the Baltic Sea
 Blake's 7, a BBC science fiction television series first broadcast 1978–1981
 B7 (album), 2020 album by Brandy Norwood

See also
 7B (disambiguation)